Sir Oliver St George, 1st Baronet (died October 1695) was an Irish Member of Parliament.

Biography
Oliver St George was the son of Sir George St George of Carrickdrumrusk and Katherine Gifford, and grandson of Richard St George, Clarenceux King of Arms,

In February 1658 he was knighted by Henry Cromwell, Lord Deputy of Ireland (this honour passed into oblivion with the Restoration in May 1660). In January 1659 Lord Montgomery, Sir Oliver and others took control of Dublin Castle and made Jones and two of his colleagues prisoners. They set up a Council of Officers assumed the government of Ireland, and summoned a Convention of Estates (or Convention Parliament). The Convention accepted Charles's Declaration of Breda and proclaimed him King of Ireland.

After the Restoration St George was knighted by Charles II in Whitehall on 11 July 1660, and was appointed a Commissioner of Irish Affairs. Later the same year on 5 September he was created a Baronet, of Carrickdrumrusk in the county of Leitrim, in the Baronetage of England. King Charles II also made him a member of the Irish Privy Council.

From 1691 to his death he held the post of Vice-Admiral of Connaught.

Between 1692 and 1693 Sir Oliver represented County Galway in the Irish House of Commons. He died in October 1695.

Family
St George married, before 1652, Olivia, widow of George Thornton and daughter of Michael Beresford of Coleraine and Mary, daughter of John Leak, by whom he had four children.

He was succeeded in the baronetcy by his son George St George, who was later created Baron St George. Another son, Oliver St George, was also appointed to the Irish Privy Council. He also had two daughters, Olivia and Katherine. Olivia married firstly after 1693, as his fourth wife, the prominent landowner and statesman Sir Robert Colville of Newtown House, Newtownards, who died in 1697, secondly Pierce Butler, 4th Viscount Ikerrin, who died in 1711, and thirdly a Mr. Wroth, or Booth of Epsom, Surrey. She died in 1724. Katherine married Sir Edward Crofton, 2nd Baronet, by whom she had two sons, and died c.1689/90.

References

Sources

Further reading

1690s deaths
Members of the Privy Council of Ireland
Baronets in the Baronetage of Ireland
Year of birth missing
Members of the Parliament of Ireland (pre-1801) for County Leitrim constituencies
Irish MPs 1661–1666
Members of the Parliament of Ireland (pre-1801) for County Galway constituencies
Irish MPs 1692–1693